Back to Brooklyn is the eighth live album by Barbra Streisand, which was released in the US on November 25, 2013. The album was recorded over two nights in October 2012 during the Barbra: Live tour stop, held at Brooklyn's Barclays Center. The album peaked at number 189 on the Top Current Albums chart.  It also charted in Belgium, the Netherlands, Germany, and the United Kingdom.

Track listing

DVD
"Back to Brooklyn"
"As If We Never Said Goodbye" 
"I Remember Brooklyn (Dialogue)" 
"Nice 'N' Easy" / "That Face" 
"The Way He Makes Me Feel"
"Bewitched, Bothered and Bewildered"
"Didn't We" 
"Smile" (feat. Il Volo)
"Q&A"
"Sam, You Made The Pants Too Long"
"No More Tears (Enough is Enough)"
"The Way We Were" / "Through The Eyes of Love"
"Being Good Isn't Good Enough"
"Rose's Turn" / "Some People" / "Don't Rain on My Parade"
"I Remember Barbra" 
"You're the Top" 
"What I'll Do" / "My Funny Valentine" 
"Lost Inside of You" 
"Evergreen" 
"Nature Boy" 
"How Deep Is the Ocean?" 
"People" 
"Here's to Life" 
"Make our Garden Grow" / "Somewhere" 
"Some Other Time" 
"Happy Days Are Here Again"

CD
"I Remember Barbra #1"
"As If We Never Said Goodbye" 
"Nice 'N' Easy" / "That Face" 
"The Way He Makes Me Feel"
"Bewitched, Bothered and Bewildered"
"Didn't We" 
"Marvin Hamlisch Intro"
"The Way We Were" / "Through the Eyes of Love"
"Jule Styne Intro"
"Being Good Isn't Good Enough"
"Rose's Turn" / "Some People" / "Don't Rain on My Parade"
"I Remember Barbra #2" 
"You're the Top" 
"What I'll Do" / "My Funny Valentine" 
"Lost Inside of You" 
"Evergreen" 
"Jason Gould Intro"
"How Deep Is the Ocean?" 
"People" 
"Here's to Life Intro"
"Here's to Life" 
"Make our Garden Grow" 
"Some Other Time Intro" 
"Some Other Time"

Weekly charts

References

External links
Barbra Archives: Back to Brooklyn (2013)

2013 live albums
Barbra Streisand live albums